"Il faut laisser le temps au temps" is a 1990 song recorded as a duet by the French singers Didier Barbelivien and Félix Gray. Written by Barbelivien, while the music was composed by Gray, this ballad was released in November 1990 and became the second single from their 1991 album Les Amours cassées. It hit number one on the single chart in France, and was also a success in the French-speaking part of Belgium.

Charts performance
In France, "Il faut laisser le temps au temps" debuted at number 18 on the chart edition of 1 December 1990, which was the highest debut that week. It entered the top ten two weeks later and managed to dislodge François Feldman's "Petit Frank" at number one in its eighth week, jumping from number five to number one, which allowed Gray and Barbelivien to become the first duo to obtain two number one singles in France. It stayed atop for two weeks, being replaced at this position by Enigma's worldwide hit "Sadeness (Part I)", remained for three weeks at number two, then started to drop on the chart, and eventually totalled 15 weeks in the top ten and 21 weeks in the top 50. 

"Il faut laisser le temps au temps" reached a peak of number four on the Belgian (Wallonia) chart, on 22 December 1990, thus failed to match the massive success of "À toutes les filles...", the duo's previous single, which was number one. It was only number 37 on the Belgian (Flanders) chart, on which it charted for a sole week.

On the Eurochart Hot 100, "Il faut laisser le temps au temps" debuted at number 39 on 15 December 1990, peaked at number eight six weeks later, and cumulated seven weeks in the top 20 and 19 weeks in the top 100.

Track listings
 7" single
 "Il faut laisser le temps au temps" — 3:56
 "Il faut laisser le temps au temps" (instrumental) — 3:57

 CD single
 "Il faut laisser le temps au temps" — 3:56
 "Il faut laisser le temps au temps" (instrumental) — 3:57

Personnel
 Lyrics - Didier Barbelivien
 Music - Félix Gray
 Guitarist - José Souc
 Design cover - FKGB
 Photography - Alain Marouani
 Recording company - Zone Music
 Arrangements - Bernard Estardy
 Artistic direction - Jean Albertini

Charts and sales

Peak positions

Year-end charts

Release history

See also
 List of number-one singles of 1991 (France)

References

1990 singles
Didier Barbelivien songs
Félix Gray songs
SNEP Top Singles number-one singles
Pop ballads
Male vocal duets
Songs written by Didier Barbelivien
1990 songs